"Mercury Blues" is a song written by rural blues musician K. C. Douglas and Robert Geddins, and first recorded by Douglas in 1948.  The song, originally titled "Mercury Boogie," pays homage to the American automobile marque, which ended production in 2010.

Rights to the song were purchased by the Ford Motor Company (who already owned the Mercury marque). Ford, in turn, used it for a television commercial featuring Alan Jackson singing his version of the song with the word "Mercury" replaced by the words "Ford Truck."

The song has been covered by many musicians. Among the most notable versions are ones by country musician Alan Jackson in 1993, rock musician David Lindley, from his 1981 album El Rayo-X, and rock musician Steve Miller, from his 1976 album Fly Like an Eagle. Lindley's single peaked at number 34 on the Billboard Hot Mainstream Rock Tracks chart.

Alan Jackson version 

American country music artist Alan Jackson recorded the song for his album, A Lot About Livin' (And a Little 'bout Love). It was released in September 1993 as the fourth single from the album. His version of the song peaked at number 2 on both the U.S. Billboard Hot Country Singles & Tracks (now Hot Country Songs) chart and the RPM Country Tracks in Canada.

Critical reception 

Kevin John Coryne of Country Universe gave the song a B grade, calling it "a throwaway track that ended up being a pretty big hit." He went on to say that it "might be the least essential Jackson hit of its era."

Music video 

The music video was directed by Piers Plowden and premiered in mid-1993. Keith Urban makes an appearance in the video as a guitar player.

In popular culture 

His rendition was used by the Ford Motor Company for Ford pickup truck commercials, changing the line "crazy 'bout a Mercury" to "crazy 'bout a Ford truck." Jackson performed the original "Mercury" version of the song live "in-studio" on an episode of the hit ABC sitcom Home Improvement in 1996. The David Lindley version appeared on the "Florence Italy" episode of Miami Vice on February 14, 1986.

Chart positions

Year-end charts

References

1948 songs
1993 singles
David Lindley (musician) songs
Alan Jackson songs
Songs about cars
Song recordings produced by Keith Stegall
Arista Nashville singles
Mercury (automobile)